During the 2002–03 Dutch football season, PSV Eindhoven competed in the Eredivisie.

Season summary
PSV won the title, pipping Ajax by a single point. There was less success in Europe: they finished bottom of their group, and also suffered the indignity of conceding the fastest goal in Champions League history, with Gilberto Silva scoring 21 seconds after kick-off in PSV's 4-0 home loss to Arsenal.

First-team squad
Squad at end of season

Left club during season

Results

UEFA Champions League

Group stage

References

PSV Eindhoven seasons
PSV Eindhoven
Dutch football championship-winning seasons